Pittsgrove Presbyterian Church is a historic church on Main Street (also called Daretown Road) in the Daretown neighborhood of Upper Pittsgrove Township, Salem County, New Jersey, United States.

It was built in 1767 and added to the National Register of Historic Places in 1977.

See also
National Register of Historic Places listings in Salem County, New Jersey

References

External links 
 

Churches on the National Register of Historic Places in New Jersey
Churches completed in 1767
Churches in Salem County, New Jersey
Presbyterian churches in New Jersey
National Register of Historic Places in Salem County, New Jersey
New Jersey Register of Historic Places
1767 establishments in New Jersey
18th-century Presbyterian church buildings in the United States
Upper Pittsgrove Township, New Jersey